The 1962 United States Senate election in Pennsylvania was held on November 6, 1962. Incumbent Democratic U.S. Senator Joseph S. Clark, Jr. successfully sought re-election to another term, defeating Republican nominee James E. Van Zandt.

A Democratic U.S. Senator would not be elected in Pennsylvania until 1991, and not again in a regular election until 2006. This was the last time the Democrats won the Class 3 Senate seat from Pennsylvania until John Fetterman's victory in 2022.

General election

Candidates
Arla A. Albaugh (Socialist Labor)
Joseph S. Clark Jr., incumbent U.S. Senator since 1957 (Democratic)
James E. Van Zandt, U.S. Representative from Altoona (Republican)

Campaign
The 1962 Senate race took place alongside a gubernatorial race that garnered most of the media's attention. Van Zandt criticized Clark for being an idealistic liberal and stressed an anti-communist platform. He also attacked Clark for Clark's support of the Kennedy administration's foreign policy towards both China and Cuba. In return, Clark portrayed Van Zandt as a proponent of McCarthyism who would be "trigger happy" as a Senator.

In the end, Clark was re-elected to the United States Senate, winning his second term. He beat Van Zandt in the nine-county area of Southwestern Pennsylvania surrounding Pittsburgh by nearly 200,000 votes, but lost Central Pennsylvania and the Philadelphia suburbs to Van Zandt. Clark increased his margin of victory in the Southwest from 1956, and his 108,000 vote margin in Allegheny County was an important factor in his victory.

Results

Notes

References

Pennsylvania
1962
1962 Pennsylvania elections